Jan Mertens (2 March 1904 in Hoboken, Antwerp – 21 June 1964) was a Belgian cyclist. Professional from 1926 to 1931, he won the Tour of Flanders in 1928 and ranked fourth in the Tour de France in 1928.

Major results
1922
3rd of Binche–Chimay–Binche

1924
3rd of the Belgian National Road Race Championships independents

1925
3rd of the Tour of Belgium independents

1926
Schaal Sels-Merksem
2nd of Scheldeprijs

1927
2nd stage of the Tour of Belgium

1928
Tour of Flanders
3rd of Scheldeprijs
4th of the Tour de France

Results in the Tour de France
1926: 26th
1928: 4th
1930: 15th

References

1904 births
1964 deaths
Belgian male cyclists
Cyclists from Antwerp
People from Hoboken